Gamma-glutamyltranspeptidase may refer to:
 Gamma-glutamyl transpeptidase, an enzyme
 Glutathione hydrolase, an enzyme